Zebulon Montgomery Pike (January 5, 1779 – April 27, 1813) was an American brigadier general and explorer for whom Pikes Peak in Colorado was named. As a U.S. Army officer he led two expeditions under authority of President Thomas Jefferson through the Louisiana Purchase territory, first in 1805–1806 to reconnoiter the upper northern reaches of the Mississippi River, and then in 1806–1807 to explore the southwest to the fringes of the northern Spanish-colonial settlements of New Mexico and Texas. Pike's expeditions coincided with other Jeffersonian expeditions, including the Lewis and Clark Expedition and the Red River Expedition in 1806.

Pike's second expedition crossed the Rocky Mountains into what is now southern Colorado, which led to his capture by the Spanish colonial authorities near Santa Fe, who sent Pike and his men to Chihuahua (present-day Mexico) for interrogation. Later in 1807, Pike and some of his men were escorted by the Spanish through Texas and released near American territory in Louisiana.

In 1810, Pike published an account of his expeditions, a book so popular that it was translated into several languages for publication in Europe. He later achieved the rank of brigadier general in the American Army and served during the War of 1812, until he was killed during the Battle of York in April 1813, outside the British colonial capital of Upper Canada.

Early and family life

Early life and education
Pike was born on January 5, 1779, in Lamington, New Jersey. He was the son of Isabella (Brown) and Zebulon Pike, and would follow in the footsteps of his father, who had begun his own career in the military service of the United States in 1775 at the beginning of the American Revolutionary War. Through his father he was a direct descendant of Robert Pike, who was famous being an opponent of the Salem witchcraft prosecutions of 1692.

Zebulon Pike Jr. grew to adulthood with his family at a series of outposts in Ohio and Illinois—the United States' northwestern frontier at the time. He was commissioned as a second lieutenant of infantry in 1799 and promoted to first lieutenant later that same year.

Marriage and family
Pike married his cousin Clarissa Harlow Brown in 1801. They had one child who survived to adulthood, Clarissa Brown Pike, who later married President William Henry Harrison's son, John Cleves Symmes Harrison. They had four other children who died before reaching adulthood.

Military career
Pike's military career included working on logistics and payroll at a series of frontier posts, including Fort Belle Fontaine near St. Louis. General James Wilkinson, appointed Governor of the Upper Louisiana Territory and headquartered there, became his mentor.

In 1796, Pike shadowed the expedition of General Georges Henri Victor Collot, a French officer who had been tasked to tour the Mississippi frontier and draw maps that France might use if it were to try and seize the lightly settled territory from the nascent United States.

First expedition
In the summer of 1805, Wilkinson ordered Pike to locate the source of the Mississippi River, explore the northern portion of the newly created Louisiana Territory, and expel Canadian fur traders illegally trading within the borders of the United States. Pike left St. Louis on August 9, 1805, proceeding upstream by pirogue. He and his crew reached the confluence of the Mississippi and Minnesota Rivers on September 21, where he negotiated a treaty with the Dakota, purchasing the future site of Fort Snelling. The expedition proceeded further upriver, stopping to construct a winter camp at the mouth of the Swan River, south of present-day Little Falls, on October 16. On December 10, they continued upstream along the frozen river on foot, visiting several British North West Company fur posts along the way.

They reached the fur post at Leech Lake on February 1 and stayed nearly three weeks. Pike informed the traders they were within the boundaries of the United States and henceforth required to abide by its laws and regulations. Pike met with many prominent Ojibwe chiefs, prevailing on them to surrender the medals and flags given to them as tokens of allegiance by the British and offering American peace medals. He also relayed the United States' desire that the Ojibwe and Dakota cease their mutual hostility and invited the chiefs to attend a peace conference in St. Louis (all declined the invitation to travel through several hundred miles of hostile territory). On February 10, they ceremonially shot the British red ensign from the fur company's flag pole, replacing it with an American flag. On a short side trip (February 12 to 14), Pike traveled to the North West Company fur post on Upper Red Cedar Lake (later renamed Cass Lake), designating the lake as the upper source of the Mississippi and taking celestial observations to determine its latitude.

Pike and his men left Leech Lake on February 18, carrying diplomatic tokens from the Ojibwe chiefs to present to the Dakota chiefs as a gesture of reconciliation, arriving at their winter encampment on March 5. They re-embarked in their pirogues for the downriver journey on April 7, reaching St. Louis on April 20. Pike's was the second expedition dispatched by the government into its new territory, and the first to return.

Second expedition

After Pike returned from this first expedition, General Wilkinson almost immediately ordered him to mount a second expedition, this time to explore, map, and find the headwaters of the Arkansas and Red rivers. Additional objectives of this exploratory expedition into the southwestern part of the Louisiana Territory were to evaluate natural resources and establish friendly relations with Native Americans. It is commonly said that his expedition was an innocent exploration of the West, but that is not the case. This was a mission to prepare for an American invasion of New Mexico. Beginning July 15, 1806, Pike led what became known as the "Pike Expedition".

In early November 1806, Pike and his team sighted and tried to climb to the summit of the peak later named after him (Pikes Peak). They made it as far as Mt. Rosa, located southeast of Pikes Peak, before giving up the ascent in waist-deep snow. They had already gone almost two days without food.

They then continued south, searching for the Red River's headwaters, and built a fort for shelter during the winter. However, they had crossed the border, whether through confusion or deliberation. Spanish authorities captured Pike and some of his party on February 26, 1807.

Pike and his men were taken to Santa Fe and on to the capital of Chihuahua province, and presented to Commandant General Salcedo, who was governor of the state. Pike was treated well and invited to formal social dinners but still not quite given the treatment of a visiting dignitary, and his men were kept prisoner. Salcedo housed Pike with Juan Pedro Walker, a cartographer who also acted as an interpreter. Walker transcribed and translated Pike's confiscated documents, including his journal. Spanish authorities feared the spread of both democracy and Protestant Christian sects that might undermine their rule.

During this time, Pike had access to various maps of the southwest and learned about Mexico's discontentment with Spanish rule. Spain filed official protests with the United States about Pike's expedition, but since the nations were not at war (and Spain was rebelling against Napoleon's brother, who was fighting England in the Peninsular War), Commandant Salcedo released the military men. The Spanish escorted Pike and most of his men north, releasing them at the Louisiana border on July 1, 1807.

War of 1812
Pike was promoted to captain during the southwestern expedition. In 1811, Pike fought with the 4th Infantry Regiment at the Battle of Tippecanoe. He was promoted to colonel of the 15th Infantry Regiment in July 1812. Pike's military career also included service as deputy quartermaster-general in New Orleans and inspector general during the War of 1812.

Pike commanded the advance guard of an American force which was defeated - primarily because of the poor planning and half-hearted effort of his commander, Henry Dearborn - at the first Battle of Lacolle Mills in November 1812. Pike was promoted to brigadier general in March 1813. Along with General Jacob Brown, Pike departed from the newly fortified rural military outpost of Sackets Harbor, on the New York shore of Lake Ontario, for what became his last military campaign. On this expedition, Pike commanded combat troops in the successful attack on York (now Toronto) on April 27, 1813. Pike was killed, along with numerous other American troops, by flying rocks and other debris when the withdrawing British garrison blew up its ammunition magazine as Pike's troops approached Fort York.  His body was brought by ship back to Sackets Harbor, where his remains were buried at the military cemetery.

Journals
The Spanish authorities confiscated Pike's journals, which were not recovered by the United States from Mexico until the 20th century. Pike wrote an account from memory of his expeditions, which was published in 1810 as The expeditions of Zebulon Montgomery Pike to Headwaters of the Mississippi River, through Louisiana Territory, and in New Spain, during the Years 1805-6-7. These journals and maps gave Americans important information about trade opportunities along with the blueprints for the Santa Fe Trail. It was popular and was later translated into Dutch, French, and German editions. It became popular reading for all American explorers who followed him in the 19th century.

Pike's capture by the Spanish and travel through the Southwest gave Pike insight into the region. For example, he described the politics in Chihuahua, which led to the Mexican independence movement, and described trade conditions in the Spanish territories of New Mexico and Chihuahua.

In some eastern regions of North America, a tradition or legend pervades often referred to as The Lost City of Palanor or Zebulon's Gift which has been attributed to Pike's journals. The myth, said to be derived from a missing portion of Pike's confiscated journals, is usually told in two segments. The first sequence involves Pike's unlikely acquisition of a great treasure. The second is a description of Pike's discovery of the lost city "Palanor," said to be built by pre-Columbian European settlers, and his decision to hide the treasure there.

Legacy
As Michael Olsen shows, after Pike's death in battle, his military accomplishments were widely celebrated in terms of biographies, mourning memorials, paintings, poems, and songs, and he became the namesake for dozens of towns, counties, and ships. His memory faded after the Civil War but rebounded in 1906, at the centennial of his Southwest Expedition. His 20th-century reputation focused on his exploration, and his name appeared often on natural features, such as dams, islands, lakes, and parks. Pike's Peak remains the second most visited mountain in the world. Pike's expedition route of approximately 3,664 miles is maintained to this day by the Pike National Trail Association.

Pike was honored in 1901 by General William Jackson Palmer with a marble statue placed near the main entrance of the Antlers Hotel.  Pike was later honored in 1926 with a bronze medallion portrait placed in the pavilion at Tahama Spring (named after Pike's Dakota guide, Chief Tahama) in Monument Valley Park, Colorado Springs. For over two-hundred years, historians have debated whether Pike was truly an explorer, or if he was a spy.

Military
Fort Pike
Camp Pike, Arkansas (A sub-section of Camp Joe T. Robinson Arkansas National Guard)
USS General Pike
A building at Fort Knox is named in his honor
Liberty ship SS Zebulon Pike (appears in Episode 1 of Victory At Sea, and also in footage at the end of the film Action in the North Atlantic'')

Landforms
Pike Bay 
Pike Creek
Pike Island at the confluence of the Mississippi and Minnesota Rivers in Fort Snelling State Park, Minnesota
Pikes Peak
Zebulon Pike Lake Reservoir in Morrison County, Minnesota

CommunitiesPike County''' in:
Alabama
Arkansas
Georgia and its county seat Zebulon
Illinois
Indiana
Kentucky
Mississippi
Missouri
Ohio
Pennsylvania
Pike, New York
Piketon, Ohio
Pikeville, Kentucky
Pikesville, Kentucky (historic)
Pikeville, Tennessee
Pikesville, Maryland
Pike Bay Township, Cass County, Minnesota
Pike Creek Township, Morrison County, Minnesota
Pike Township, Marion County, Indiana
Pike Township, Wyoming County, New York
Pike Township, Stark County, Ohio

Other
Pike National Forest in Colorado
Pikes Peak State Park in Clayton County, Iowa
Pike Trail League, Kansas high school activities league
Pike Valley School District, Kansas School District, U.S.D. 426
General Zebulon Pike Lock and Dam No. 11 in Dubuque, Iowa
SRAM's RockShox division, whose R&D department is headquartered in Colorado Springs, Colorado have produced at least two shocks the Zeb and the Pike named after Zebulon 
Zebulon Ice, a Colorado Department of Transportation snowplow, in a winning name submitted by a Colorado child as part of a 2021 contest.

Notes and references

Further reading

External links
 
 
 
 National Park Service biography
 Santa Fe Trail Research
 "Butler County connections to the Mexican War" Hamilton Journal-News Hamilton, Ohio
 Pike's Explorations - related to Pike's journey to find the source of the Mississippi River and the building of his fort in what is now Morrison County, Minnesota
 Pike's Menagerie - the animals Pike and his men encountered in central Minnesota
 Was Pike a Failure? - an examination of the often-heard critique of Pike's Mississippi River expedition
 Zebulon Pike and the Blue Mountain - award-winning film produced with the help of Pike Historian W. Eugene Hollon, the U.S. Army, the Smithsonian and the National Archives about the explorer's time in what is now Colorado

1779 births
1813 deaths
Adjutants general of the United States Army
American explorers
United States Army personnel of the War of 1812
Explorers of North America
Pre-statehood history of Minnesota
History of United States expansionism
Inspectors General of the United States Army
People from Trenton, New Jersey
Pikes Peak
United States Army generals
American military personnel killed in the War of 1812
Explorers of the United States
Red River of the South
People from Bedminster, New Jersey
Military personnel from New Jersey